Bonner Springs–Edwardsville USD 204 is a public unified school district headquartered in Bonner Springs, Kansas, United States.  The district includes portions of the cities of Bonner Springs, Edwardsville, Kansas City, and nearby rural areas.

Schools
The school district operates the following schools:
 Bonner Springs High School
 Clark Middle School
 Bonner Springs Elementary School
 Delaware Ridge Elementary School
 Edwardsville Elementary School
 McDanield Preschool Center
 Head Start

See also
 Kansas State Department of Education
 Kansas State High School Activities Association
 List of high schools in Kansas
 List of unified school districts in Kansas

References

External links
 

School districts in Kansas
Education in Wyandotte County, Kansas